National Highway 122 is a national highway of India. This highway runs entirely in the state of Bihar. It is a spur road of National Highway 22. NH-122 was previously numbered NH-28.

Route 
NH-22 near Muzaffarpur - Dholi - Musrigharari - NH-31 near Barauni.

Junctions 

  Terminal near Muzaffarpur.
  near Musrigharari
  Terminal near Barauni.

See also 
 List of National Highways in India
 List of National Highways in India by state

References

External links 

 NH 122 on OpenStreetMap

National highways in India
National Highways in Bihar